Acleris bengalica is a species of moth of the family Tortricidae. It is found in India (Bengal).

References

Moths described in 1964
bengalica
Moths of Asia